The Mon National Front was a political party in Burma.

History
The party contested national elections for the first and only time in 1960,  when it won three seats in the Chamber of Deputies.

References

Defunct political parties in Myanmar